Eustroma reticulatum, the netted carpet, is a moth of the family Geometridae. The species was first described in1775, by the Austrian lepidopterist's, Michael Denis and Ignaz Schiffermüller.

Description
There is one generation per year and the moths are on wing in July and August, flying from dusk. They come to light and can be disturbed by day amongst the foodplant, or can be seen resting nearby.

Eggs are laid singly on the foodpland and the larvae are found from July to September. They feed at night on touch-me-not balsam (Impatiens noli-tangere), at first making holes in the leaves and later within the developing seedpods. In captivity they will feed on other balsams such as orange balsam (Impatiens capensis) but not on Indian balsam (Impatiens glandulifera) which is naturalised in the Lake District and out competes touch-me-not balsam.

Overwinters as a pupa on moist ground, near the foodplant, in an earthen cocoon.

Distribution
It is found in Europe, western and central Siberia, northern Mongolia, the Amur region, Khabarovsk, Primorsk, Sakhalin, Kurils, China, the Korean Peninsula and Japan. 

Great Britain
It is one of the rarest species of moth in Great Britain and is found in the Lake District and two sites in north Lancashire. The moth was close to near extinction in the 1980s and 1990s, but monitoring of nineteen sites shows that the moth is responding well to conservation management with more than 900% increase in abundance since 2000. The moth was previousLy found in Wales; near Bala in 1930 and near Dolgellau in 1973.

Subspecies
 Eustroma reticulatum reticulatum (Europe, Siberia)
 Eustroma reticulatum chosensicola (Amur, Sakhalin, Kurils)
 Eustroma reticulatum dictyotum (eastern Asia)
 Eustroma reticulatum obsoletum (Kamchatka)

References

External links
 Reintroduction of the netted carpet moth Eustroma reticulatum to Derwentwater, The Lake District, Cumbria, England

Cidariini
Moths described in 1775
Moths of Asia
Moths of Europe
Taxa named by Michael Denis
Taxa named by Ignaz Schiffermüller